11D or 11d may refer to:
 GCR Class 11D, a class of British 4-4-0 steam locomotive
Kepler-11d, an exoplanet orbiting the star Kepler-11

See also
D11 (disambiguation)